Scalidiopsis youngi is a species of beetles in the family Passandridae, and the only species in the genus Scalidiopsis. It was described by Burckhardt and Slipinski in 1991.

References

Beetles described in 1991
Passandridae